Elzevir Creek is a creek in the Moira River and Lake Ontario drainage basins in Tweed, Hastings County in Central Ontario, Canada.

Course
The Skootamatta River flows via the Moira River into the Bay of Quinte on Lake Ontario at Belleville.

See also
List of rivers of Ontario

References

Rivers of Hastings County